The Central District of Esfarayen County is a district (bakhsh) in Esfarayen County, North Khorasan Province, Iran. At the 2006 census, its population was 99,381, in 24,945 families.  The District has one city: Esfarayen.  The District has five rural districts (dehestan): Azari Rural District, Daman Kuh Rural District, Milanlu Rural District, Rezqabad Rural District, and Ruin Rural District.

References 

Districts of North Khorasan Province
Esfarayen County